Afik Nissim (born January 31, 1981) is an Israeli professional basketball player for Elitzur Yavne of the Israeli National League.

Early life
Nissim was born in Rehovot, Israel, to a Tunisian-Jewish family. He played for Maccabi Rishon LeZion youth team.

Professional career
In 1998, Nissim started his professional career in Maccabi Rishon LeZion.

In 2003, Nissim signed a two-year deal with the French team Strasbourg IG. Nissim won the French League Championship with Strasbourg in 2005.

On July 11, 2008, Nissim signed with the Italian team Prima Veroli under head coach Andrea Trinchieri and alongside his teammate Kyle Hines. Nissim won the Italian LNP Cup with Veroli for two consecutive years.

On September 14, 2010, Nissim signed a one-year deal with the Czech team ČEZ Nymburk under head coach Ronen Ginzburg. Nissim won the 2011 Czech League Championship and the 2011 Czech State Cup titles with Nymburk.

On September 13, 2011, Nissim signed with the Russian team Enisey for the 2011–12 season.

On January 8, 2012, Nissim parted ways with Enisey to join KK Krka of the Slovenian Basketball League for the remainder of the season. Nissim won the 2012 Slovenian League Championship with Krka, earning the Finals MVP honors.

On October 8, 2012, Nissim returned to Israel and signed with Hapoel Eilat. In his third season with Eilat, Nissim helped the team reach the 2015 Israeli League Finals, where they eventually lost to Hapoel Jerusalem.

On August 24, 2016, Nissim signed a two-year contract extension with Hapoel Eilat.

On November 18, 2017, Nissim recorded a career-high 32 points, along with 3 rebounds and 4 assists, shooting 13-for-17 from the field, in an 88–82 win over Hapoel Gilboa Galil.

On November 6, 2018, Nissim signed a one-year deal with Elitzur Yavne of the Israeli National League. In 28 games played for Yavne, he averaged 10.4 points, 1.7 rebounds and 3.4 assists per game.

On July 7, 2019, Nissim signed a one-year contract extension with Yavne.

National team career
Nissim was a member of the Israel national basketball team. He participated in the 2005, 2011 and 2013 Eurobasket tournaments.

Nissim was also a member of the Israeli National Under-20 team. In July 2000, he helped the Israeli team reach the 2000 FIBA Europe Under-20 Championship Final, where they eventually lost to Slovenia.

Career statistics

EuroCup

|-
| style="text-align:left;"| 2006–07
| style="text-align:left;" rowspan=2|  Strasbourg
| 14 || 2 || 20.0 || .453 || .383 || .886 || 1.4 || 2.0 || .9 || .1 || 11.1 || 10.3
|-
| style="text-align:left;"| 2007–08
| 10 || 0 || 21.9 || .390 || .476 || .857 || 1.9 || 2.0 || .6 || .0 || 10.4 || 9.7
|-
| style="text-align:left;"| 2010–11
| style="text-align:left;"|  Nymburk
| 11 || 9 || 27.6 || .508 || .405 || .889 || 2.9 || 2.4 || .8 || .0 || 12.6 || 12
|-
| style="text-align:left;"| 2011–12
| style="text-align:left;"|  Krka
| 6 || 6 || 15.5 || .385 || .357 || .938 || 1.8 || 2.2 || .8 || .0 || 8.3 || 7.8
|- class="sortbottom"
| style="text-align:center;" colspan=2 | Career
| 41 || 17 || 21.1 || .448 || .411 || .891 || 2 || 2.1 || .8 || .0 || 11 || 9.3

Domestic Leagues

|-
| 1998–99
| style="text-align:left;" rowspan=4| Maccabi Rishon
| style="text-align:center;" rowspan=5| IPL
|| 9 || 8.3 || .625 || .438 || .600 || .8 || 1.0 || .0 || .0 || 4.4
|-
| 1999–00
| 20 ||23.5 || .500 || .438 || .868 || .8 || 1.8 || 1.1 || .0 || 11.3
|-
| 2000–01
| 28 || - ||  .462 || .326 || .875 || 1.9 || 3.1 || 1.0 || .0 || 12.5
|-
| 2001–02
| 27 || 28.0 || .426 || .279 || .814 || 1.6 || 1.9 || .9 || .0 || 10.2  
|-
| 2002–03
| style="text-align:left;" | Ramat HaSharon
| 27 ||34.3 || .530 || .422 || .826 || 2.1 || 3.9 || 1.6 || .0 || 16.2
|-
| 2003–04
| style="text-align:left;" rowspan=2| Strasbourg
| style="text-align:center;" rowspan=2| Pro A
| 34 ||18.0 || .446 || .405 || .792 || 1.5 || 3.2 || .5 || .0 || 8.1
|-
| 2004–05
| 37 ||19.8 || .465 || .455 || .825 || 1.5 || 2.2 || .6 || .0 || 10.0
|-
| 2005–06
| style="text-align:left;" | Lokomotiv Kuban
| style="text-align:center;" | RBSL 1
| 22 || - || .364 || .463 || .882 || 2.0 || 2.1 || 1.0 || .0 || 11.1
|-
| style="text-align:center;" | 2006
| style="text-align:left;" | BC Kyiv
| style="text-align:center;" | UBSL
| 16 ||- || .525 || .433 || .962 || 3.1 || 5.1 || .7 || .0 || 10.9
|-
| 2006–07
| style="text-align:left;" rowspan=2| Strasbourg
| style="text-align:center;" rowspan=2| Pro A
| 35 || 21.1 || .446 || .397 || .878 || 1.6 || 2.5 || .4 || .0 || 11.3
|-
| 2007–08
| 25 || 24.6 || .373 || .291 || .833 || 1.6 || 3.0 || .8 || .0 || 9.9
|-
| 2008–09
| style="text-align:left;" rowspan=2| Prima Veroli
| style="text-align:center;" rowspan=2| Serie A2
| 30 ||29.3 || .495 || .317 || .808 || 2.3 || 3.7 || 2.2 || .0 || 14.2
|-
| 2009–10
| 40 ||30.7 || .557 || .399 || .860 || 2.4 || 4.1 || 1.2 || .0 || 14.8
|-
| 2010–11
| style="text-align:left;" | ČEZ Nymburk
| style="text-align:center;" | NBL
| 22 ||22.4 || .500 || .324 || .940 || 2.8 || 2.5 || .4 || .0 || 11.2
|-
| 2011–12
| style="text-align:left;" | Enisey
| style="text-align:center;" | VTB
| 10 || 21.0 || .383 || .412 || .800 || 1.4 || 2.4 || .4 || .1 || 6.8
|-
| style="text-align:center;" | 2012
| style="text-align:left;" | Krka
| style="text-align:center;" | 1. SKL
| 16 || 24.6 || .491 || .361 || .892 || 1.8 || 3.5 || 1.0 || .0 || 10.0
|-
| 2012–13
| style="text-align:left;" rowspan=6| Hapoel Eilat
| style="text-align:center;" rowspan=6| IPL
| 27 || 25.0 || .421 || .377 || .891 || 1.7 || 2.9 || 1.3 || .0 || 12.0
|-
| 2013–14
| 36 || 24.8 || .418 || .388 || .881 || 1.3 || 3.5 || .5 || .0 || 12.0
|-
| 2014–15
| 44 || 29.5 || .417 || .335 || .912 || 2.1 || 3.6 || 1.1 || .0 || 11.8
|-
| 2015–16
| 37 || 26.7 || .363 || .319 || .890 || 1.3 || 4.0 || .9 || .0 || 9.3
|-
| 2016–17
| 35 || 16.3 || .458 || .450 || .903 || .7 || 1.2 || .3 || .0 || 9.1
|-
| 2017–18
| 34 || 13.4 || .410 || .364 || .833 || .8 || 1.6 || .3 || .0 || 5.4
|-
| style="text-align:center;" | 2018–19
| style="text-align:left;" | Elitzur Yavne
| style="text-align:center;" | INL
| 28 || 25.4 || .475 || .377 || .820 || 1.7 || 3.4 || .6 || .1 || 10.4
|-
|}
Source: Basket.co.il & RealGM

References

External links
 RealGM profile
 FIBA profile

1981 births
Living people
BC Enisey players
BC Kyiv players
Basketball Nymburk players
Elitzur Yavne B.C. players
Hapoel Eilat basketball players
Hapoel Haifa B.C. players
Israeli Basketball Premier League players
Israeli expatriate basketball people in France
Israeli expatriate basketball people in the Czech Republic
Israeli Jews
Israeli men's basketball players
Israeli people of Tunisian-Jewish descent
Jewish men's basketball players
KK Krka players
Maccabi Rishon LeZion basketball players
People from Rehovot
Point guards
SIG Basket players
Israeli expatriate basketball people in Italy
Israeli expatriate basketball people in Russia
Israeli expatriate basketball people in Ukraine